The following table is a List of ambassadors to Colombia that contains the names of the accredited ambassadors to the Republic of Colombia . Note that not all ambassadors reside in Colombia, as some are dually accredited to Colombia in a Non-Resident capacity. Also of note is that some ambassadors, although appointed and accredited by the sending country, have not yet presented their Letters of Credence to the President of Colombia or his representative.

Current ambassadors to Colombia

See also
List of ambassadors of Colombia
List of diplomatic missions of Colombia
List of diplomatic missions in Colombia

Notes

References

External links

 
 
 

 
Colombia
 

es:Anexo:Embajadores acreditados en Colombia